Ghansawangi or Ghansavangi is a town and a tehsil in the Partur subdivision of the Jalna district in the state of Maharashtra, India. Its distance from Aurangabad (by road and on highway) is about 60 kilometers.

Ghansavangi is within the Parbhani Loksabha constituency. Parbhani consists of Jintur, Gangakhed, Partur, Pathri and Parbhani Assembly constituencies. Ghansawangi assembly constituency is represented by the Health Minister in the Maharashtra state government of Maharashtra, Rajesh Tope.

Gurupimpri is one of the oldest villages in Ghansawangi tehsil.

References 

Cities and towns in Jalna district
Talukas in Maharashtra